Panthersville is a city with the census-designated place (CDP) in DeKalb County, Georgia, United States. The population was 9,749 at the 2010 census.

History
The community most likely was named after a Cherokee Indian subtribe.

Geography
Panthersville is located at  (33.705639, -84.278551). The Candler-McAfee CDP is to the north and Gresham Park CDP is to the west.

Demographics

2020 census

As of the 2020 United States census, there were 11,237 people, 4,036 households, and 2,251 families residing in the CDP.

2000 census
As of the census of 2000, there were 11,791 people, 4,150 households, and 2,963 families living in the CDP. The racial makeup of the CDP was 1.91% White, 96.34% African American, 0.16% Native American, 0.20% Asian, 0.05% Pacific Islander, 0.31% from other races, and 1.02% from two or more races. Hispanic or Latino of any race were 1.19% of the population.

There were 4,150 households, out of which 38.7% had children under the age of 18 living with them, 33.3% were married couples living together, 31.9% had a female householder with no husband present, and 28.6% were non-families. 23.2% of all households were made up of individuals, and 2.0% had someone living alone who was 65 years of age or older.  The average household size was 2.83 and the average family size was 3.31.

In the CDP, the population was spread out, with 30.1% under the age of 18, 12.0% from 18 to 24, 32.9% from 25 to 44, 21.0% from 45 to 64, and 4.0% who were 65 years of age or older.  The median age was 29 years. For every 100 females, there were 85.1 males.  For every 100 females age 18 and over, there were 77.3 males.

The median income for a household in the CDP was $38,590, and the median income for a family was $43,363. Males had a median income of $30,836 versus $26,602 for females. The per capita income for the CDP was $16,935.  About 7.7% of families and 10.1% of the population were below the poverty line, including 15.2% of those under age 18 and 8.2% of those age 65 or over.

Economy
Panthersville is home to the Gallery at South DeKalb, formerly South DeKalb Mall, a regional shopping center with a Macy's (former Rich's) department store. The former JC Penney now houses independent stores such as Super Beauty and Conway.

The CDP is the headquarters for the Georgia Bureau of Investigation, and for Georgia Regional Hospital state psychiatric ward.

Education
The CDP is incorporated within the  DeKalb County Public Schools zone:
 Elementary schools: Barack H. Obama EMST (in the CDP), Flat Shoals (in the CDP), and Columbia (outside of the CDP)
 Middle schools: Ronald E. McNair (most) and Columbia (some) (outside of the CDP)
 High schools: Ronald E. McNair High School (most) and Columbia High School (some) (both outside of the CDP)

References

Census-designated places in DeKalb County, Georgia
Census-designated places in Georgia (U.S. state)
Census-designated places in the Atlanta metropolitan area